The Kansas City Roller Warriors (KCRW) is a women's flat track roller derby league based in Kansas City, Kansas that was founded in 2004. The members of the league are split into four home teams that play within the league and two travel teams that represent KCRW in competition with other leagues. KCRW is a founding member of the Women's Flat Track Derby Association (WFTDA), and the Kansas City Roller Warriors All Star travel team was the winner of the 2007 WFTDA Championships, the "Texas Shootout", which took place in Austin, Texas.

History
KCRW was founded in 2004 by Brooke Leavitt and Mandy Durham, who worked together as librarians. Inspired by the Texas Rollergirls, the KCRW LLC was solidified by June 2004. That summer, the two and a group of other women began practicing in a parking lot, forming the first practice of the Kansas City Roller Warriors. John Hernandez, a friend of the founders from college, became the team's first coach and the small contingent of team members distributed hand fliers to promote women to try out for the team. By the fall of 2004 the team was practicing at a local community center, on a basketball court.

Since its formation, the group consists of more than 80 players and four at-home teams: The Black Eye Susans, the Dreadnought Dorothys, the Knockouts and the Victory Vixens. KCRW originally held their bouts at the Winnwood Skate Center and Hale Arena in Kansas City before moving to the Kansas City Municipal Auditorium, where they skated through 2015. KCRW now plays home games and practices at Memorial Hall (Kansas City, Kansas) in Kansas City, Kansas. Approximately 30 people provide volunteer assistance for each at-home event, including referees, announcers, score keepers and other support staff.

Teams
The league has four home teams: the Black Eye Susans, the Dreadnought Dorothys, the Knockouts and the Victory Vixens. The Victory Vixens hold the KCRW home championship title for 2015, having won against the Dreadnought Dorothys.

The Roller Warriors held their first official season from January through June 2005 at Winnwood Skate Center. The founding season for KCRW drew 800 attendees. Through 2016, average bout attendance has been 2,000.

The Victory Vixens won the KCRW home championship title in 2015, having won against the Dreadnought Dorothys.

Travel teams

The All Star team, founded in 2005, is composed of members of the four home teams of the Kansas City Roller Warriors. They compete at a national and international level. In 2007, the KCRW All Stars won the Women's Flat Track Derby Association Championships against the Rat City Rollergirls. The All Stars won the 2010 WFTDA South Central Regional Tournament and the league hosted the WFTDA 2011 South Central Regional Tournament. The All Stars placed first in the 2015 WFTDA International Division 2 Tournament held in Cleveland, Ohio.

Plan B is KCRW's second travel team, with members from all home teams who travel regionally. The team made its debut in 2011.

Junior derby
In 2010, Ami Geddon, a Kansas City Roller Warrior, worked to grow a junior roller derby league in Kansas City. She recruited other skaters with experience in coaching and teaching children. Along with Ami Geddon, Connie Magic, Jade Lightning, Bomb Pop, PDQ, Maiden Hell, Damsel of D'tension and Murphy's Law were the team's first coaches.

Madam McBomb took on the head coach role in 2014, at the time there were 16 active skaters.  The following year the number of skaters grew to 34 and by 2017 the league had 50 Junior skaters. In 2014, McBomb transitioned the Juniors program from a summer program to a year-round program.  About 10 percent of the youth skaters go on to play for the adult league after turning 18.   The league is open to girls and boys ages 8 –17.

WFTDA competition

In February 2006, KCRW sent their All Star travel team to play in the first National WFTDA Championships in Tucson, Arizona. KCRW placed sixth in the nation out of twenty participating leagues. In 2007, Kansas City finished in fourth place at the first WFTDA Western Regional Tournament after a 111-62 loss to Texas Rollergirls. The KCRW All Stars returned to Championships, that year known as the "Texas Shootout", and defeated the Rat City Rollergirls for the title by a score of 89 to 85. All Star Xcelerator was awarded MVP for the tournament. In 2008, Kansas City was the top seed at the Western Regional but was upset in their opening game by Duke City Roller Derby, and ultimately finished in fifth place by defeating Pikes Peak Derby Dames 159-71.

Ahead of the 2009 season, the WFTDA adjusted its structure, and Kansas City was placed in the South Central Region. At that year's WFTDA South Central Regional Tournament, the KCRW All Stars finished in second place after a 150-73 loss to Texas. At that year's Championships, Kansas City lost their opening round match to Denver 175-89 and was eliminated. Kansas City took first place at the 2010 South Central Regional, defeating Texas 157-127. At the 2010 Championships, Kansas City lost in the quarterfinals 147-126 to Philly Roller Girls. At the 2011 South Central Regional, Kansas City finished in second place, losing the title game 132-92 to Texas. At Championships, Kansas City finished fourth, matching up again against Texas and losing the third-place game 136-122. Kansas City skater Kelley Young was named MVP for the tournament. In 2012, Kansas City took third place at the final South Central Regional with a 209-169 victory over Tampa Roller Derby. At Championships that year, Kansas City was eliminated in the opening round by Minnesota Rollergirls 244-168.

In 2013, the Women's Flat Track Derby Association replaced the geography-based regions with three competitive divisions. With their ranking at 21 on June 30, the KCRW All Star team qualified for the Division 1 playoffs, and competed in the tournament held in Richmond, Virginia, where they placed fifth by defeating Jacksonville RollerGirls 199-171. Kansas City finished in eighth place at the 2014 Sacramento Division 1 tournament, losing to Santa Cruz Derby Girls 171-122. The All Stars placed first at the 2015 WFTDA International Division 2 Playoff Tournament held in Cleveland, defeating Demolition City Roller Derby 171-142. Kansas City skater Bruz-Her was named MVP for the tournament. At the Division 2 Championships in St. Paul that year, Kansas City finished in fourth place, losing their rematch to Demolition City 149-139. At the 2016 Wichita Division 2 Playoff, Kansas City finished in eighth place after a 223-119 loss to Tucson Roller Derby.

Rankings

Community work
A portion of the proceeds from the league's home bouts are donated to local charities including the Kansas City Police Activities/Athletic League, American Cancer Society, American Diabetes Association, Human Rights Campaign, the Rose Brooks Center, and many more. KCRW has partnered with the Mid America Chapter of the National Multiple Sclerosis Society.

See also

 List of roller derby leagues

References

Roller derby leagues established in 2004
Sports in the Kansas City metropolitan area
Roller derby leagues in Kansas
Women's sports in the United States
2004 establishments in Kansas